Richard Kahn may refer to:

Richard Kahn, Baron Kahn (1905–1989), British economist
Richard C. Kahn (1897–1960), American film director
Richard Kahn (bridge) (1912–1987), American bridge player